The 1939 Philadelphia mayoral election saw the election of Robert Eneas Lamberton.

Results

References

1939
Philadelphia
1939 Pennsylvania elections
1930s in Philadelphia